Dothan Preparatory Academy is located in Dothan, Alabama, USA. The high school district roughly runs down U.S. Highway 84, which runs east to west through the heart of Dothan.

History

Dothan High School was built in 1911 for the education of white students and was originally located on Burdeshaw Street. It was one of the most modern high schools in the state. When this school opened, the state required only three years of high school, but Dothan High went to a four-year curriculum in 1912. The George S. Houston Memorial Library is now on the former site of the Burdeshaw Street building. In 1942 this building was torn down and an elementary school was built on the site and named for Minnie T. Heard. The central section of the existing Dothan High facility on South Oates Street was built in 1939.  Numerous additions have been made at various points through the years since, such that DHS has a full cafeteria, separate auditorium, and two full gymnasiums, with an additional gymnasium at the adjacent Doug Tew Recreation Center.

For most of the school's history, only whites were allowed to attend. Some black students were admitted under a choice program started in 1963. In the summer of 1969 a federal court ordered immediate integration of the schools. In the fall of 1969, students from the black school, Carver, were transferred to Dothan. A judge removed the segregation consent decree in 2008, although it was noted that only 7 percent of teachers were black, a decrease from 11 percent when the decree was implemented and less than the 18 percent blacks made of the total population.

Sports
Dothan High fields 11 varsity teams, including football, baseball, softball, basketball, soccer, tennis, track, cross country, volleyball, golf and cheerleading teams.  In addition, Dothan High club teams include boys' varsity and junior varsity, as well as girls' varsity and junior varsity teams.

Clubs and extracurriculars
Spanish Club
SADD (Students Against Destructive Decisions)
Club HOPE (Helping Our Personal Environment)
Key Club
National Honor Society
Drama Club
Marching Band
FBLA (Future Business Leaders of America)
Diamond Dolls
Ultimate Frisbee 
Yearbook
 Literary Guild

Advanced placement courses
Dothan High School currently offers a variety of Advanced Placement courses available to students. These classes include:
AP World History
AP US History
AP English Language
AP Literature
AP Psychology
AP Chemistry
AP Environmental Science
AP Biology
AP Stats
AP Calculus

Notable alumni

 Larry Brackins, American football wide receiver
 Johnny Mack Brown, American football halfback, Actor
 Richmond Flowers, Sr., Attorney General of Alabama, 1963–1967
 Steadman S. Shealy, American football quarterback, Attorney
 Bobby Goldsboro, singer, songwriter

External links

References

Public high schools in Alabama
Educational institutions established in 1911
Schools in Houston County, Alabama
1911 establishments in Alabama